John Hull may refer to:

Politicians
John Hull (MP for Hythe), MP for Hythe
John Hull (MP for Exeter) (died 1549), English politician
John A. T. Hull (1841–1928), American politician
John C. Hull (politician) (1870–1947), Speaker of the Massachusetts House of Representatives from 1925 to 1928

Theologians and educators
John C. Hull (economist) (born 1946), professor of derivatives and risk management at the University of Toronto
John M. Hull (1935–2015), professor of religious education at the University of Birmingham
John H. E. Hull (1923–1977), theologian, Mansfield College, Oxford c.1967–1971

Others
John Hull (merchant) (1624–1683), American colonial merchant and politician
John A. Hull (1874–1944), Judge Advocate General (1924–1928) and Associate Justice of the Supreme Court of the Philippines (1932–1936)
John E. Hull (1895–1975), United States Army general
John Hull (physician) (1761–1843), physician and obstetrician

See also
John Hulle (disambiguation)